
Xun Huisheng (5 January 1900 - 26 December 1968) was one of Peking Opera's "Four Great Dan", along with Mei Lanfang, Cheng Yanqiu, and Shang Xiaoyun. All four were men who played the female lead roles (dan) during the generation when such roles became open to actresses again, after two centuries of exclusively male portrayal.

Life
Xun's father was one of Peking Opera's "Four Famous Die" (Sì Dàmíng Diē), along with Li Shaochun, Tan Xiaopei, and Li Wanchun's fathers.

Xun was best known for his portrayal of the "flowery girl" (hua dan) roles, women who tended to be more vivacious or even of questionable character. He served as one of the mentors and guardians of the actress Li Yuru as she began her career.

He died in Hebei on 26 December 1968.

References

Citations

Bibliography
 .

1900 births
1968 deaths
Chinese male Peking opera actors
Female impersonators in Peking opera
20th-century Chinese male singers
20th-century Chinese male actors
People from Dongguang County
Male actors from Hebei
Singers from Hebei
People persecuted to death during the Cultural Revolution